Cleariestown, or Cleristown, is a small village situated in the south of County Wexford, in Ireland. Cleariestown village has a Roman Catholic church (with adjoining cemetery).

See also
 List of towns and villages in Ireland

References

Towns and villages in County Wexford